Eanes Independent School District (EISD) is a school district headquartered in unincorporated Travis County, Texas (USA), in Greater Austin. Its enrollment is about 7,814 students, distributed among six elementary schools, two middle schools, and one high school.  All nine schools are rated Exemplary - the highest designation possible - in the State of Texas 2009 accountability ratings, marking the second consecutive year for that accomplishment.  The district's overall state is Exemplary, making Eanes ISD one of just two 5A districts in the state to receive that designation in 2009.  Only 9.5 percent of districts statewide are rated exemplary.  See the bottom of this page for more information about TEA accountability ratings.

The school district encompasses the whole city of West Lake Hills, a majority of Rollingwood, the Lost Creek neighborhood, and parts of Austin including Davenport, the Rob Roy neighborhoods, Seven Oaks, and the Cuernavaca neighborhoods.

History
"A log cabin built on property of Robert Eanes (1805-95) in 1872 was the first Eanes school. In 1874 the school was moved to a one-room frame structure on this adjacent 2-acre tract given by William and Sophia Teague. Itinerant Ministers conducted worship service in the Schoolhouse, and a community cemetery was located nearby. Eanes Chapel, organized in 1923 by University Presbyterian Church in Austin, erected a stone building in 1928. It was purchased in 1956 for classrooms. The Eanes Independent School District, created in 1958, is now (1975) a modern educational complex with over 1,800 Students." Quote from a plaque located on the current Eanes Elementary Campus.

"The year 1957 proved to be a watershed year for the Eanes community because that year county officials decided to close down the county’s school system. Eanes residents faced two alternatives. They could vote to join the Austin Independent School District or they could go it alone and establish their own system…the voters, on April 12, 1958, opted to stay independent…establishing the Eanes Independent School District."

Academic Achievements
Texas nonprofit, Children at Risk, 2014 Greater Austin School District Rankings – Eanes ISD is ranked #3 in the Austin Area and #33 in the State based on Student Achievement, Campus Performance and Growth.

 the district spends $18,000 per student, above the national average.

Eanes ISD is ranked number one in the state for Best Places to Teach, College Readiness, and Best Facilities as of December 1, 2015. On the national level, Westlake was the only comprehensive four-year Texas public school in the top 60.

Technology in Schools
"The Eanes school district will become one of the first in the state to distribute iPads to every single one of its students, kindergarten through 12th grade." Jan. 2013

Schools

Westlake High School

Westlake High School (established 1969) has an enrollment of about 2,400 students. The school is a U.S. Blue Ribbon School and has won the Texas Successful Schools Award for Outstanding Performance. Its principal is Steve Ramsey.  The school is a member of the Model Schools initiative. The current recognition by the TEA is under the Exemplary rating, the highest possible.

Middle schools
Hill Country Middle School (established 1975) has an enrollment of about 900 students. The school was named a U.S. Blue Ribbon School  in 1990-91 and has won the Texas Successful Schools Award for Outstanding Performance. Its principal is Mrs. Kathleen Sullivan. (as of 2011).
West Ridge Middle School (established 1987) has an enrollment of about 903 students. The school was named a U.S. Blue Ribbon School in 1992-93 and has won the Texas Successful Schools Award for Outstanding Performance. Its principal is Ms. Dianne Carter.

Primary schools

Barton Creek Elementary School (established 1991) - mascot: Blue Jays - Principal: Tiffany Phelps - 2000-01 National Blue Ribbon School
Bridge Point Elementary School (established 1997) - mascot: Bobcats - Principal: Sheri Bryant
Cedar Creek Elementary School (established 1978) - mascot: Eagles - Principal: Laura Coaxum
Eanes Elementary School (established 1872) - mascot: Mustangs - Principal: Lesley Ryan - National Blue Ribbon School in 1996-97  and 2005 
Forest Trail Elementary School (established 1984) - mascot: Falcons - Principal: Holly Reid</ref> - 1989-90 National Blue Ribbon School
Valley View Elementary School (established 1982) - mascot: Cardinals - Principal: Jennifer Dusek - 1996-97 National Blue Ribbon School

References

External links 

 
 

School districts in Travis County, Texas
Education in Austin, Texas
School districts established in 1958